Savdhaan India – India Fights Back ( Attention India! – India Fights Back) is an Indian Hindi-language crime show aired by Star Bharat. The series is hosted by Ashutosh Rana, Tisca Chopra, Sushant Singh, Gaurav Chopra, Mohnish Behl, Pooja Gaur, Saurabh Raj Jain, Shivani Tomar, Pratyusha Banerjee, Hiten Tejwani, vivek jha Divya Dutta, Sidharth Shukla and Mohit Malik. It provides dramatised versions of real-life crimes in India and the story of struggle of the victims to get justice for their sufferings.

Initially the series aired as Crime Alert on Life OK. A rebooted version of the series called Savdhaan India – India Fights Back began broadcast on Life OK on 23 July 2012. Versions of the program (focusing on a particular Indian state/city) have also aired as Savdhaan India – Maharashtra Fights Back, hosted by Shreyas Talpade, Savdhaan India – Mumbai Fights Back, hosted by Atul Kulkarni, Savdhaan India – Punjab Fights Back and Savdhaan India – U.P Fights Back. The show continued to air on replacement channel of Life OK which is STAR Bharat from 28 August.

Series overview

Cast

Cast arranged according to alphabetical order

A
Ananya Agarwal as Ruchi Sharma (Episode 522)
 Abhishek Singh Rajput as Kartik (Episode 43)
 Anjali Abrol as Aditi Mishra (Episode 556) / Maya (Episode 736) / Piya (Episode 946) / Janvi (Episode 1127) / Keerti (Episode 1185) / Dr. Vasudha (Episode 1281) / Nivedita (Episode 1354) / Shikha Gagnani (Episode 1463)
Amit Behl as Pandit Jamunadas (Episode 2357)
Ahsaas Channa as  Bela (Episode 534) / Suhana (Episode 749) / Deepti Agarwal, Journalism College Student (Episode 895) / Divya (Episode 1141) / Neena, Board Exam Candidate (Episode 1200)
 Aastha Chaudhary as Geeta Joshi (Episode 2) / Priya Ajay Mishra (Episode 169)
 Amita Choksi as Shalmali (Episode 1927)
Amit Dua as Dhananjay (Episode 534)
Anil Dhawan as Omveer (Episode 1669)
 Ahmad Harhash as Asad Khan (Episode 3000)
 Aashka Goradia as Asma (Episode 1068)
 Additi Gupta as Razia (Episode 787)
 Amrapali Gupta as Jyoti (Episode 90)
 Amin Hajee  as Munshiji (Episode 2121)
 Ali Hassan as Ravi (Episode 471) / Episode 882 / Pankaj (Episode 1128) / Dr. Deepak (Episode 1468) / Shreeram (Episode 1797)
 Adi Irani as  Kishorilal (Episode No 231) / Surinder, Mental Patient (Episode 900) / Ranvijay (Episode No 1293) / Sagar  (Episode No 1629)
Amardeep Jha as Mrs. Briganza (Episode 218) / Bhagwatidevi (Episode 585) / Narayani (Episode 1111) 
 Aalisha Panwar as Kriti
 Ajay Purkar as Police Inspector Sadanand Darekar (Episode 66)
 Aashish Kaul as Mani Bhushan (Episode 450) / Ramen Sharma (Episode 522) / Advocate Vinay Salaskar (Episode 616) / Varun Khanna (Episode 789) / Abhinav (Episode 841) / Aashish (Episode 1422) / Amit (Episode 1694) / Aashish (Episode 1742) / Lakshman Singh Shekhawat (Episode 1890) / Mr. Gupta (Episode 1983)
 Adaa Khan as Sneha Mulle / Pooja Saxena (Episode 425) / Malti Anmol Shah (Episode 1118)
Alam Khan as Bhulla, Dumb Child (Episode 707)
Aleeza Khan as Meera (Episode 81) / Veena Sharma ( Episode 175) / Rupa Sharma (Episode 588) / Divya (Episode 826) /  Geetinder, Geet (Episode 877) / Meghna (Episode 1118) / Poonam (Episode 1392) / Ashima (Episode 2271)
Aanchal Khurana as Priya (Episode 742) / Supriya (Episode 1052) / Gayatri Anmol Shah (Episode 1118) / Rashi Prashant Pandey (Episode 1254) / Pragya (Episode 1319) / Minu (Episode 1336) / Kiran (Episode 1506) / Sanika (Episode 1619) / Rajjo (Episode 2393).
 Ahmed Khan Society Secretary (1871)
 Ankit Mishra as Anurag (Episode 2025)
Ankit Mohan as Rahul, Photographer (Episode 324) / Samar (Episode 366)
 Akshaya Naik as Niharika (Episode 2293)
 Lankesh Bhardwaj as Police Inspector
 Ankur Nayyar as Sikh Police Inspector  (Episode 47) / Prince Adhiraj Singh (Episode 664) / Rana Rao (Episode 1278)
Apurva Nemlekar as  Sushma Deshmukh (Episode 2145) / Jyoti, Train Passenger (Episode 2199)
Amrita Prakash as Naina (Episode 1236) / Anshi (Episode 2174)
Aruna Sangal as (Episode 1907)
 Amit Sareen as Karan (Episode 504)
Ankita Mayank Sharma as (Episode 460)
Anurag Sharma (actor) as Vinod (Episode 603)
 Akshay Sethi as Prateek (Episode 36) / Rohan (Episode 65) / Nirmal (Episode 190) / Rohit (Episode 374) / Rohit (Episode 528) / Aryan Joshi (Episode 607) / Nikhil Chaddha (Episode 665) / Vikram (Episode 697) / Sandeep (Episode 729) / Deepak (Episode 806) / Episode 954 / Raman (Episode 1039) / Amol (Episode 1360) / Episode 1519 / Sanket (Episode 1667) / Dr. Brijesh (Episode 1734) / Episode 2324 / Amar (Episode 2693) / Episode 86 / Avdesh (Episode 195)
 Amit Singh as Pratap (Episode 61)
 Anshul Singh as Vikram Singh (Episode 886) / Ravi (Episode 617) / Rahul (Episode 650) / Tej (Episode 1217) / Pratham (Episode 1261) / Ravi (Episode 2398)
 Anushka Singh as Amandeep Kaur (Episodes 65 and 66) / Uma Devi (Episode 41) / Archana Arvind Gupta (Episode 182) / Suman (Episode 763) / Shraddha Sharma (Episode 1352) / Manisha (Episode 1561) / Shilpi (Episode 1628) / Amit's wife (Episode 1694) / Dr. Madhu (Episode 1776)
 Amit Varma  as Manish Joglekar (Episode 353) / Dev (Episode No 1594)
 Aman Verma as Inspector Rajendra Mishra (Episode 1065) / Mahesh (Episode 2162)
Akanksha Sareen  as Geet (Episode 1507) / Sheetal (Episode 2355)
 Abbas Ghaznavi  as (Episode 1511) / Rahul (Episode 1945) / Shantanu (Episode 2228) / Arun (Episode 2320) / Sonu (Episode 2403)
  Anjali Rana  as Shashi (Episode 491) / Meghna (Episode 709) / Neha (Episode 1006)
 Anuya Y Bhagwat as Ganga (Episode 207) / Uma (Episode 479) / Tina (Episode 1505) / Meet (Episode 2312)
 Amita Yadav as Neha (Episode 1492)
 Aashish Mehrotra as Manoj (Episode 10)
 Alefia Kapadia as Niyati (Episode 1067) / Divya (Episode 1245) / Rekha (Episode 1407) / Margi (Episode 1582) / Sarika (Episode 1677)
 Aman Sandhu as Sandhya (Episode 1810) / Sushma (Episode 2388)
 Asit Redij as Fauji Kaka (Episode 1810)

B
Baby Farida as Mother-in-Law (Episode 1181) / Ratna Rastogi (Episode 2251)
 Birbal as Mukhiya (Sarpanch) (Episode 158) / (Episode 420)
 Bhumika Gurung as Kavita (Episode 3305)
 Brij Gopal  as Daroga Joginder (Episode 1542)
 Bharti Kumeria  as Mehak (Episode 1807)
 Bhawna Barthwal as Shobha (Episode 275) / Amrit (Episode 1493)
 Bakul Thakkar  as Phillip, Psychotic Father (Episode 188)

C
 Chaitanya Choudhury as Captain Vikram (Episode 804)
 Chetan Hansraj as ACP Abhijeet (Episode 1118)
 Chandan Madan as Harvinder  (Episode 521) /  Shekhar (Episode 727)/  Sanjeev (Episode 759) / Amit (Episode 1618) / Harmeet (Episode 1707)
 Chandrika Saha  as Sonia Pereira (Episode 1847)
  Chirag Dave  as Dilip (Episode 226)

D
Dishank Arora as Vikram Mehra  (Episode 1558)
 Dalljiet Kaur as Shruti (Episode 31 - Episode 35)
 Dimple Kava as Kamala Bhabhi (Episode 329)
Dinesh Kaushik as Nekichand Jain  (Episode 1349) /  Rastogi (Episode 1154) / Gupta (Episode 1898) / Episode 2287
Dolly Minhas  (Episode 784) / Damini Verma (Episode 1132) / (Episode 1657)
 Daljeet Soundh  as Daadi,Thief (Episode 2390)
Daya Shankar Pandey as  Corrupt Politician Veer Singh (Episode 679)
Dushyant Wagh as  Bhaskar (Episode 783) / Sukesh,  College Student (Episode 1134)
  Deepanshu Titoriya  as Kartik (Episode 2372)
  Dincy Vira  as Lali (Episode 844) / Tiya (Episode 2561)
  Dolphin Dwivedi  as Manju (Episode 128) / Aditi (Episode 497) / Padmini / Bina (Episode 1711)
  Dolly Chawla  as Pratiksha (Episode 1531) / Bakul (Episode 1629) / Sheetal (Episode 2113)
  Dhruvi Haldankar as Rajni (Episode 185) / Deepali (Episode 742) / (Episode 2359) / Dolly (Episode 2643)
  Devika Sharma as Rahila (Episode 741) / Chahal (Episode 1006)

E
  Emir Shah  as Gippy (Season 6 Episode 5) / Vicky (Season 7 Episode 4)
  Ekta Tiwari as Ratna (Episode 674)

F
 Falaq Naaz as Manisha (Episode 36) / Rehana Hussain (Episode 201) / Naina (Episode 251) / Gauri (Episode 297)

G
Gajendra Chauhan as Baba Anand,  Fraud Spiritual Guru (Episode 259)
Girish Jain (Episode 912)
 Gunn Kansara as Geeta (Episode 1657) / Amrita Verma (Episode 1789)
 Geetanjali Mishra as Dr. Rohini (Episode 76) / Neetu (Episode 370) / Neeru Sharma (Episode 484) /  Karuna (Episode 525) / Kavita (Episode 943) / Nakshatra Pandey (Episode 1001) /  Drishti (Episode 1135) / Jyoti (Episode  1239) / Rajni (Episode 1497) / Lata (1831) / Sandhya (Episode 2318) / Zeenat (Episode 2658)
 Girish Pardesi as Gulabchand (Episode 617)
 Gargi Sharma as  Sheetal Khanna (Episode 215) /  Amita (Episode 797) / Pinky (Episode 840) / Ankita (Episode 900) / Kaajal (Episode 1841)
 Garima Goel as kavya (Episode 821) / Renuka (Episode 1041)
 Gazal Saini as Reema (Episode 1987) / Pooja (Episode 2379)

H
 Himanshu Rai as Akhilesh (Episode S65 E45)
Harsh Khurana as Doctor Pradhan (Episode 2287)
 Hrishikesh Pandey as Inspector Surendra (Episode 2028)
 Harsh Vashisht as Satyendra Singh (Episode 675) / Dr. Virat Agarwal (Episode 1765)
 Harpreet Chhabra

I
 Indira Krishnan as Sulekha Vatsh (Episode 36)

J
 Jitendra Trehan  as Police Inspector Bhosale (Episode 495) / (Episode 1734) / Avinash (Episode 2313)
Jiya Shankar as Roshni
Jyoti Gauba as Amrita (Episode 987) / Saroja (Episode 1141) / Saroj (Episode 1516)/ Mala (Episode 1617) Archana (Episode 1787)
 Jatin Bhatia as Raj (Episode  370)
Jasveer Kaur as Janvi (Episode 837)

K
Kapil Arya (Episode 2341)
 Khyaati Khandke Keswani  as Kavita (Episode 1174)
  Khushboo Kamal 
 Kinshuk Mahajan as Ashok (Episode 1138) / Uday (Episode 1775)
 Kishore Mahabole  as Kedarbhai (Episode 1406)
Kishwer Merchant as Sharmila ( Episode 528) / Roshni (Episode 580)
Kanan Malhotra as Dr.Rahul (Episode 1308)
 Khalid Siddiqui as Vinay (Episode 779)
 Kamlesh Oza as Nathuram (Episode 2403)
 Kunal Bakshi as Dr. Karan (Episode 821) / Karan (Episode 1397)
 Kunal Jaisingh as Arjun
 Khushboo Atre as Mamta (Episode 348) / Sakshi (Episode 481) / Bina (Episode 633)
 Kiran Khoje as Reshma (Episode 2541)
 Kanishka Soni as Maya (Episode 1346) / Sweety (Episode 1843)
 Khushi Khan as Nikita (Episode 841) / Chiriya (Episode 2344)
 Khushboo Tawde as Asha, Train Passenger (Episode 2038) / Sarika (Episode 2181)

L
 Lankesh Bhardwaj as Inspector

M
 Mahhi Vij as Dr. Anju (Episode 40) / Reha (Episodes 1–5)
Mehul Buch as Doctor Vipul Seth (Episode No 1290) / Haribhai, Housing Society Secretary (Episode 2174)
Maadhav Deochake as Doctor (Episode 259)
 Madhuri Dikshit as Dai Maa ( Episode 514)
Manini Mishra as Radhika (Episode 768) / Prabha (Episode 1847)
 Mamik Singh as Naveen Neelam (Episode 611) / Udaybhan Singh (Episode 664)
 Maninder Singh as Inspector (Episode 458)
 Mala Salariya as RJ Rohini (Episode 1269) / Reshma (Episode 2230)
 Manav Gohil as Danny (Episode 350)
 Manish Goel as Mohan Awasthi, Serial Killer (Episode 2006)
 Megha Gupta as Seema (Episode 610) / Neelam Gaurav Rajput (Episode 635) / Episode 777 / Devika (Episode 883) / Simran (Episode 1168)
Manish Khanna as Corrupt Police Inspector Mahesh Kamdaar (Episode 1361)
Meghan Jadhav Sanish Shirke (Episode 120) / Sanjay (Episode 352) / Amit Srivastav (Episode 496)  /  Sunny Khurana (Episode 636)
 Muni Jha as Naren Bhai (Episode 2118)
Mihir Mishra as Saahil (Episode 768)
Muskaan Mihani as Sunanda, Housewife (Episode 702)
Meet Mukhi as (Episode 747) / Suraj Ranjit Singh (Episode 2373)
 Mihir Rajda  as Bhavesh (Episode 1372)
Mukesh Rawal as Sharma, wheel chair Handicapped patient (Episode 774)
 Mrinalini Tyagi as Sulochana (Episode 1193) / Smriti (Episode 1956)
 Mridul Das  as Manu (Episode 2325) / Sampat (Episode 2656)
 Muskaan Bamne as Soni (Episode 1490)
 Mansi Nirmal Jain  as Sheena (Episode 1690)
 Muskaan Uppal  as Komal (Episode 1076)
Monica Khanna as Sunanda (Episode 1118)
 Mukesh Solanki as Vineet (Episode 1216)

N
Neha Bam as Uma (Episode 1443)
 Nikhil Arya as Vinod (Episode 2287)
Neena Cheema as Pushpa (Episode 360) / Rukminidevi (Episode 496) /  Mrs. Deshpande (Episode 783) / Mrs. Bhatia (Episode 890) / Nimrat Kaur Singh (Episode 1035)
 Nasir Khan  as Santram Chaudhary (Episode 1933)
 Nidhi Jha as Dimple (Episode 293) / Sona Bhushan (Episode 450) / Divya (Episode 580) / Niyati Patel ( Episode 739) /  Sunita (Episode 892) / Riya Gupta (Episode 1134) / Ayesha (Episode 1244), 
 Niyati Joshi as Priya (Episode 516) / Parmeet (Episode 639) / Mehak (Episode 1244) / Dipika (Episode 1311) / Esha (Episode 1451) / Mahika (Episode 1528) / Neeru (Episode 1664) / Ritu (Episode 2190)
Navni Parihar as Rajashree (Episode 645)
 Neelima Parandekar as Suman (Episode No 829)
Nandini Singh as Sanaya (Episode 651) / Kiran (Episode 751)/ Parminder,Pammi (Episode 877) / Rupa (Episode 996) /  Vaishali (Episode 1290) / CBI officer (Episode 2320) / Saloni (Episode 2541)
 Narayani Shastri as Saroja Arvind Khattar (Episode 962)
 Nausheen Ali Sardar as Chandni (Episode 673)
 Neetha Shetty as  Sheetal (Episode 220) / Veena Ghanshyam Chaurasia (Episode 358) / Bharti (Episode 467) / Rati (Episode 601) / Advocate Ketki Diwan / Madhu (Episode 664) / Rashi Pawar (Episode 692) / Sanjana (Episode 729) / Kkusum (Episode 851) / Jyoti Pandey (Episode 979) / Nirali (Episode 1271) / Kalyani (Episode 2130)
 Naresh Suri  as Prakashchand Rawat (Episode 2387)
 Nabeel Ahmed as Rahul and Niketan
 Namrata Thapa as Maya Sameer Malhotra (Episode 704) / Neeta Verma (Episode 1132) / Mausami (Episode 1316)
 Neetu Pandey  as Karuna (Episode 674) / Sapna (Episode 2404)
 Nishant Singh as Rohan (Episode 2351)

O
 Ojaswi Oberoi as Megha (Episode 1564) / Komal (Episode 1648) / Tanisha (Episode 46)

P
Pankaj Berry as Police Inspector Yashwant Chauhan (Episode 532)
 Parul Chauhan as Roopa (Episode 47)
 Preetika Chauhan  as Pallavi (Episode 42) / Rajni (Episode 1443) / Manali (Episode 1619) /  Kalpana Fake Doctor(Episode 2394)
 Poonam Chandorkar  as Police Inspector Aditi Sharma (Episode No 2060)
 Prince Sharma  as cleaver Driver (episode 64)
Pankaj Dheer as Gurubaksh (Episode No 732)
 Preeti Gandwani as Shweta (Episode 1308) / Kiran's sister-in-law (Episode 1506) / Sheetal (Episode 1623) / Amod's wife (Episode 1908)
 Priya Marathe as Sapna / Reshma (Episodes 21–25)
Payal Nair as Lisa (Episode 1210)
Papiya Sengupta as Maya, Beauty parlour Owner (Episode 152)
 Pradeep Shukla  (Episode 1941)
 Prinal Oberoi as Mrs. Ajay Singh (Episode 1476) / Meena (Episode 2101) / (Episode 2165)
 Pooja Pihal  as Dhwani (Episode 1219) /  Ragini (Episode 1515) / Garima Akash Sharma (Episode 1576) / Kirti (Episode 1675) / Sangeeta (Episode 2192)
 Prachi Thakker as Rukmani (Episode 1472) / Jignesh's wife (Episode 2272)
 Puneet Vashisht as Bittu (Episode 584) / Amay (Episode 1773) / Vikas (Episode 2303)
 Pankaj Vishnu  as Rakesh Shinde (Episode 511) / Anand (Episode 733) / Manik Bhai (Episode 921)
Prithvi Zutshi as Charandas (Episode 356) / Narendra Shergill (Episode 785) / Prakash Trivedi (Episode 798) / Kamlesh (Episode 2405)
 Priya Shinde  as Alka (Episode 925) / Shaila (Episode 1216) / Vaishali (Episode 1426) / Aditi (Episode 1558) / Meena (Episode 1590)
 Piyush Suhane  as Ajay (Episode 165) / Yograj (Episode 223) / Suryavansh (Episode 673) / Bhuvan Singh (Episode 2403)
 Puneet Channa  as Jagan (Episode 80) / Sunil (Episode 511) / Chirag (Episode 806) / Gaurav (Episode 872) / Harish (Episode 1612) / Vikram (Episode 2271) / Avinash (Episode 2383)
Pushkar Priyadarshi as Harsh (season 8 episode 17 )
 Piyali Munshi  as Smriti (Episode 1067) / Meena (Episode 1386) / Komal (Episode 2208)
 Prachi Vaishnav as Priya 
(Season 9 episode 5)

R
 Rohit Tailor various episodes in various roles 
 Rayo Bakhirta as Arjun, Cricket Captain (Episode 1314)
Rohit Bakshi as Police Inspector Vinay Barua (Episode 460)
  Ranveer Chahal  as Lalu (Episode 15 SP19)
 Rasik Dave as Doctor Naik (Episode 1298)
Ravi Gossain as   Trilokchand (Episode 1819) / Amrish (Episode 2235) / Sangraam (Episode 2403) 
 Rucha Gujarathi as Jayshree Shah (Episode 279)
Ravi Jhankal as Shinde (Episode 959) / Shakuntala, Transgender (Episode 1408) / Praveen (Episode  2176) / (Episode 2367)
Raju Kher as Shyamlal Doshi (Episode 2242)
Resha Konkar as Alka (Episode 191) / Ratna (Episode 972)
 Rajeev Kumar as Pramod Dhillon (Episode 462) / Dr Ramesh Kulkarni (Episode 2235)
Rajesh Puri as Mr.D'Souza (Episode 2070)
 Rajeev Paul as Sanjay (Episode 1581)
 Rupa Divetia as Jaya (Episode 1431)
Rushad Rana as Rakesh Mishra (Episode 693) / Chetan (Episode 1041) /  Rahul (Episode 1540) / Deepak (Episode 1715)
 Rishabh Shukla as Kishore (Episode 279)
 Raj Singh Suryavanshi  as Ramesh (Episode 347) / Zuber (Episode 472) / Gautam (Episode 929) / Angad Mehta (Episode 1001) / Sumit (Episode 1164) / Arjun Chhotey (Episode 1632) / Kuldeep Chaurasia (Episode 2359)
 Raj Singh Verma  as  Chetan (Episode 347) / Rajat Chaudhary (Episode No 2278)
 Rishi Khurana as Vikas (Episode 731)
 Rishi Saxena as Police Inspector Vikram (Episode 1177)
 Rose Khan  as Tina (Episode  2145)
 Rakesh Kukreti  as Chandrasekhar (Episode 2106) / Vikas (Episode 2304)
 Raquel Rebello  as Arpita (Episode 408)/ Shruti (Episode 792) / Meenal (Episode 1076) / Arpita (Episode 1460) / Sapna (Episode 1744)
 Ritu Chauhan  as Chitra (Episode 743) / Shraddha (Episode 1923)
 Richa Soni as Neelam (Episode 507)

S
Shamik Abbas as Babloo (Episode 2293)
 Sarwar Ahuja as (Episode 80)
 Salil Ankola as Kunal Singh (Episode 267)
 Shakti Anand as Bharat Gupta (Episode 936) / Surajpratap Singh (Episode 2158)
 Shubhangi Atre as Seema (Episode 779)
Shruti Bapna as Nirmala (Episode 195)
 Sheena Bajaj as Ruchi (Episode 784)
 Sanjay Batra as Ajay (Episode 909)
 Shreya Bugade as Anjali Kumar,Dumb Girl (Episode 295)
 Swati Bajpai as Ritika (Episode 626) / Ria (Episode 896) / Shobha, Pregnant Housewife (Episode 1460) /  Madhu (Episode 1115)
 Sai Deodhar as Sunaina Surajpratap Singh (Episode 2158)
 Sumana Das as Pratima (Episode 22)
 Sanjay Gagnani as  Varun ( Episode 702) / Akash (Episode 872) / Dheeraj (Episode 977) / Anmol Shah  (Episode 1118) / Chirag (Episode 1244) / Fake Police Inspector Varun Chauhan (Episode 1463) / Sandeep (Episode 1538)
 Sara Khan as Savitri (Episode 766)
 Shahab Khan as Various 
 Siraj Mustafa Khan as Raghav Pratap Purohit Pintu Bhaiya , Corrupt Politician (Episode 85) / Satish (Episode 1224)
 Smriti Khanna as Ishita (Episode 1806) / Lata (Episode 2102) / Soni (Episode 2161)
 Sachin Khurana as  Rajat (Episode 483) / Vivek Sanghavi (Episode 1389)/ Arjun (Episode 1490)
 Shresth Kumar as Prasad (Episode 1353) / Akshay (Episode 1854) / Rohit (Episode 1951)
 Sunila Karambelkar as Kaushalya (Episode 1246)
 Shubhangi Latkar as Dadima (Episode 2404)
 Sheetal Maulik as Ragini (Episode 1377) / Bhabhi (Episode 1943) / Ruchi (Episode 2275)
 Shafaq Naaz as Naina Kamat (Episode 80) / Harpreet Sandhu (Episode 257)
 Samragyi Nema as Rati (Episode 829) / Manisha (Episode 960) / Nalini (Episode 1210)
 Sameer Rajda as (Episode 308)
 Sandeep Rajora as Ajay Jaiswal / Shashank Jaiswal (Episode 670) / Teacher (Episode 2308)
 Shilpa Saklani as Sonali Sandeep Rane (Episode 925)
 Sheela Sharma as (Episode No 1477) / Pratima (Episode  1881)
 Shishir Sharma as Mahesh (Episode 824) / Prashant Jain (Episode 893)
 Shakti Singh as  Subhedar (Episode 1122) / Mohan Sawant, Retd Police Officer (Episode 1919) / Ravi (Episode 1494)
 Sonia Singh as Aparna (Episode 1982)
 Sudeep Sarangi  as Chetan Pandey (Episode 979) / Mahendra Sharma (Episode 1030) / Pramod, Courier man, Serial Killer (Episode No 1919) / (Episode 1327)
 Shital Thakkar as Rituu (Episode 486) /  Rashmi (Episode 682) / Shweta (Episode 862)
 Sumona Chakravarti as Shruti (Episode 740)
 Sonakshi More  as Roshni (Episode 174) / Archana (Episode 385) / Sundari ( Episode 1447)
 Sushil Bonthiyal  as Sewa Ram (Episode 462) / Sajjan ( Episode 584) / Khurram (2524)
 Suman Patel  as Gayatri (Episode 1807) / Sakshi (Episode 2170)
 Sarika Dhillon  as Rohini (Episode 328) / Sonali (Episode 402) / Meghna (Episode 518) / Neha (Episode  747) / Kinjal (Episode 1073) / Seema (Episode 1571) / Ratna (Episode 1669)
 Sabina Jat as Vibha (Episode 73) / Kanchan (Episode 367) / Sejal (Episode 726) / Gauri (Episode 878) / Jhilmil (Episode 2359) / Ritu (Episode 2403)
 Sneha Jain as Farheen (Episode 2656)
 Shubha Saxena as Ekta (Episode 821)
 Sudeepta Singh as Zubaida (Episode 241)
 Saurabh Goyal as Akash (Episode 2300)
 Saheem Khan as Ajay (Episode 348) / Vicky (Episode 748) / Manohar (Episode  1118) / Pradeep (Episode 2388) / Abhay (Episode 2447)
Shahnawaz Pradhan as Govind (Episode 1499)
 Sonal Parihar as Rajjo (Episode 462) / Sandhya (Episode 680)
 Shweta Tiwari as Sargam, Film Actress (Episode 744)
  Sheetal Pandya  as Simmi (Episode 164)
 Shirin Sewani as Ganga (Episode 2186)
 Saurabh Agarwal  as Mukul (Episode 507)
 Sonam arora  as naini teacher (S68 E15 Hotstar)

T
 Tiya Gandwani as Professor Divya (Episode 774) / Neela's sister-in-law (Episode 1040) / Sharda (Episode 1336) / Darshana (Episode 1396) / Jyostna (Episode 1468) / Mukta (Episode 1767) / Jaya Hemant Sahni (Episode 54)
 Tarun Khanna as Devraj Singh (Episode 664)
Tejashri Pradhan as Jamuna (Episode 286)
 Tapasya Srivastava  as Kusum (Episode 1355)
 Tanvi Thakkar as Janhavi (Episode 586) / Chhaya (Episode No 892) /  Tarana (Episode 1349) / Aarti (Episode 2328)
 Tanu Vidyarthi as Kirti (Episode 1774)

U
 Usha Bachani as Damini (Episode 1327) / Sumitra (Episode 1894)
 Ulka Gupta as Megha Singh (Episode 267) / Alka, Sports Athlete (Episode 916)
 Utkarsha Naik as Hema (Episode 1164) / Sunita (Episode 1618)

V
 Varun Badola as Inspector Varun (Episode 384)
 Vikram Singh Chauhan as Arun 
 Vineet Raina as Daksh (Episode 328) / Avinash (Episode 552) / Dr. Sandeep Rane (Episode 925)
 Vivana Singh as Savita (Episode 1668)
 Vaquar Shaikh as Inspector (Episodes 21–25) / Diwakar (Episode 1476)
 Vineet Sharma as RG, Sports Trainer/Sir (Episode 916)
Vinod Kapoor as Sangraam (Episode 367) / Gulzar (Episode 472) / (Episode 629) / Satish Bhatnagar (Episode 1006) / Village School Master Jaydrath (Episode 1225) / (Episode 2315)
Vinod Singh as Aniket (Episode 1519)
 Vikas Shrivastav as Avinash Raj Singh
Vaishnavi Mahant as Meera,  Psychotic Mother (Episode 2181)
 Vinita Mahesh as Aayushi Raheja (Episode 2303) / Shweta (Episode 2331)
 Vishal Nayak as Tarun (Episode 1067) / Rahul (Episode 1431)

W
Wasim Mushtaq as Jai Sinha (Episode 2280)

Y
 Yash Pandit as Ajay (Episode 829)/ Rajiv (Episode 2106) / Karan (Episode 2293) /Keshav Tomar, Traffic Police Constable (Episode 2330)

Z
 Zarina Wahab as Nirmala (Episode 519) / Rajjo (Episode  732)
 Zeeshan Ahmed Khan as Imran Pathan (Episode 1786)

Hosts
 Ashutosh Rana
 Tisca Chopra
 Sushant Singh
 Gaurav Chopra
 Pratyusha Banerjee
 Amar Upadhyay
 Kavita Kaushik
 Mohnish Behl
 Pooja Gaur
 Hiten Tejwani
 Sidharth Shukla
 Smriti Irani
 Divya Dutta
 Saurabh Raj Jain
 Sakshi Tanwar
 Karmveer Choudhary
 Ankit Bhardwaj
 Mohit Malik
 Dayanand Shetty

See also
 List of programs broadcast by Life OK
 List of programs broadcast by Star Bharat

References

External links
 Official website on Hotstar
 

Life OK original programming
Star Bharat original programming
2012 Indian television series debuts
Balaji Telefilms television series
Indian crime television series
Television series based on actual events
Fictional portrayals of police departments in India